is a UK insolvency law case concerning whether a bank should pay restitution for moneys paid out of its account after a moratorium under the Insolvency Act 1986 section 127.

Facts
Hollicourt was a construction company and it went insolvent in 1996. The Bank of Ireland, 31 King Street, Leeds, continued to operate its account, paying money in and out, for three months after because it missed (through human error) the notification of the winding up petition in the Gazette.

Blackburne J, applying dicta from Gray’s Inn, held that the bank was liable to pay restitution for the money that had passed through its facility.

Judgment
Mummery LJ for the court (Peter Gibson LJ and Latham LJ) held that Blackburne J was wrong. Only the final recipients, not the bank, were liable to repay the money. There was no unjust enrichment on the bank’s part, and no comparable restitution case could be found. The banking transactions ‘are merely part of the process by which dispositions of the company’s property are made.’

So property could be recovered from the payees only, but not the bank which acted as a simple agent in the transfer.

See also

UK insolvency law

Notes

References

United Kingdom insolvency case law
English banking case law
Bank of Ireland
Court of Appeal (England and Wales) cases
2000 in case law
2000 in British law